Simone Dallamano (born 25 November 1983) is a former Italian footballer who last played for L'Aquila in Serie C.

Career
Dallamano started his career at his native club Brescia. After three season loaned to Serie C1 and Serie C2 clubs, he played his first Serie A match on 19 September 2004 in his return to Brescia.

In January 2013, Dallamano joined Cesena on free transfer on a six-month contract. He picked no.4 shirt vacated by Daniele Forte.

On 31 August 2013, Dallamano joined L'Aquila.

International career
Along with teammate Marco Zambelli, Dallamano was called up to the Italy national under-21 team.

References

External links
 Profile at FIGC 
 Profile at Football.it 

1983 births
Living people
Footballers from Brescia
Italian footballers
Association football defenders
Italy under-21 international footballers
Serie A players
Serie B players
Serie C players
Brescia Calcio players
Mantova 1911 players
A.C. Prato players
F.C. Lumezzane V.G.Z. A.S.D. players
A.C. Cesena players
L'Aquila Calcio 1927 players